City court or municipal court is a court of law with jurisdiction limited to a city or other municipality. It typically addresses "violations of city ordinances and may also have jurisdiction over minor criminal cases...and over certain civil cases." Examples include Moscow City Court in Russia, Municipal Court of Chicago and New York City Civil Court in the United States.

In Sri Lanka, A special Court created under the Municipal Council's Ordinance, No. 2 of 1947 (section 562). A municipality, would appoint a Municipal Magistrate. A Municipal Magistrate may be appointed to be an additional Magistrate in addition to his other duties. They do not have civil jurisdiction, they have jurisdiction over any breach of any municipal by-laws per the Municipal Council's Ordinance. Now the local magistrate courts performs the duties of the municipal magistrate courts.

See also
 Legal code (municipal)
 County court
 District court
 Inferior courts of the United States

References